María Fernanda Suárez de Garay, known professionally as Mafer Suárez, is a Mexican director, screenwriter, and producer. She is best known for her work on the Mexican television series Mujeres asesinas. She has received a lifetime achievement award from The Association of Women in Cinema and Television, and a Silver Cross for career from the GIFF.

Early life
Suárez is from Tampico, Tamaulipas. In 2019, she helped organize the first Independent Film Festival of Tamaulipas, held in Tampico. Her younger sister is actress Cecilia Suárez. She has spoken against the concept of nepotism and said that she only works with Cecilia when the production demands it; Cecilia has expressed the same.

Filmography

Film

Television

References

External links

Living people
Mexican directors
Mexican screenwriters
People from Tampico, Tamaulipas
Year of birth missing (living people)